Christian Josué Altamirano Metzgen (born 26 November 1989) is a Honduran footballer who plays as an attacking midfielder for Olancho.

International career 
He played for the Honduras national football team in 2017.

References

External links
 
 
 

1989 births
Living people
People from San Pedro Sula
Association football midfielders
Honduran footballers
C.D. Olimpia players
C.D.S. Vida players
C.D. Marathón players
Platense F.C. players
C.D. Real Sociedad players
Real C.D. España players
FC Tulsa players
USL Championship players
Honduras international footballers
2009 CONCACAF U-20 Championship players